Streptomyces xylanilyticus is a bacterium species from the genus of Streptomyces which has been isolated from soil from the Sakaerat Environmental Research Station in Thailand.

See also 
 List of Streptomyces species

References 

xylanilyticus
Bacteria described in 2017